This article shows the rosters of all participating teams at the women's goalball tournament at the 2016 Summer Paralympics in Rio de Janeiro.

Group C

The following is the Algeria roster in the women's goalball tournament of the 2016 Summer Paralympics.

The following is the Brazil roster in the women's goalball tournament of the 2016 Summer Paralympics.

The following is the Israel roster in the women's goalball tournament of the 2016 Summer Paralympics.

The following is the Japan roster in the women's goalball tournament of the 2016 Summer Paralympics.

The following is the United States roster in the women's goalball tournament of the 2016 Summer Paralympics.

Group D

The following is the Australia roster in the women's goalball tournament of the 2016 Summer Paralympics.

The following is the Canada roster in the women's goalball tournament of the 2016 Summer Paralympics.

The following is the China roster in the women's goalball tournament of the 2016 Summer Paralympics.

The following is the Turkey roster in the women's goalball tournament of the 2016 Summer Paralympics.

The following is the Ukraine roster in the women's goalball tournament of the 2016 Summer Paralympics.

See also
Goalball at the 2016 Summer Paralympics – Men's team rosters

References

2
Women's team rosters
2016 in women's sport